Le Zèbre was a French make of car built between 1909 and 1931 in Puteaux, Seine. 

The company was founded by Jules Salomon and Georges Richard with finance from Jacques Bizet, son of Georges Bizet the composer.

History
Julius Salomon was a young graduate of the School of Commerce and Industry in Bordeaux, and began his career at Rouart Brothers who were engine makers.  He later moved to Georges Richard where he met Jacques Bizet, who had the funds to back a new automotive brand and the ambition to leave a legacy to rival that of his father. The two friends decided not to give their names to the car, instead opting to call it "Le Zèbre" (The Zebra), which was originally a nickname given to a clerk of their former employer. 

In 1909 Salomon developed his first car, a 630cc single-cylinder car with two-speed gearbox, which was designated the Type A. This design proved very economical to manufacture, selling for 3,000 Francs, or 1,000 F less than competitors. The Type A was well received by the public, and attracted investment from influential businessmen Emile Akar and Joseph Lamy, which enabled factory relocation and expansion. Joseph Lamy assumed the function of Commercial Director. The success of the Type A was further assured by Baudry de Saunier, the greatest French automotive journalist of the time, who repeatedly extolled the car’s virtues. 

In 1912 Le Zèbre announced their second model, the Type B. More imposing, it was a four-cylinder four-seater car, rated at 10CV. It sold for 6,000 F, which constituted another economic tour de force for the time. The Type B was closely followed by the Type C, also a four-cylinder but this time 785cc with three gears, available only as a two-seat torpedo body. All three models were produced from the company’s new factory in Suresnes. Le Zèbre became well known for their unique blend of robustness, reliability and low running costs. 

On the outbreak of the First World War, the particularly light Le Zèbre cars turned out to be a “go-anywhere” vehicle and were selected for use as liaison vehicles by the army. From 1915, the Ministry of War placed an order for 40 cars per month and the supply of various military parts. These contracts allowed the company to retain the majority of its employees and avoid military requisition, unlike most other French car factories. 

In 1917 the two founders split up. Jules Salomon left the company and met André Citroën, the then director general at Mors and was instrumental in the development of the first Citroen cars. Le Zèbre’s ownership structure was revised, with Jacques Bizet resigning his executive position, although retaining a commercial stake in the company.

From 1918, the new Type D was marketed. It had a four-cylinder engine of 998cc and four-speed gearbox, and was rated at 8 HP. It was available in 3-seat torpedo or 4-seat sedan versions. Its selling price of 10,200 F remained very affordable. André Morel, a former test pilot at Berliet was appointed sales manager for the whole of the south of France. 

In 1921, Edmond Moyet (Chief Engineer), Emile Akar and Joseph Lamy withdrew from the company to create the rival company Amilcar. Le Zèbre struggled to cope with the loss of these key personnel and their associated capital, as well a good deal of their commercial network which Lamy and Akar were able to lure away to their new project.

With the Le Zèbre brand destabilized by the loss of key personnel, the original Type A reappeared, delivered with the Type C chassis and a slightly modified body. At the beginning of 1923, only Types A and D appeared in the catalogue, supplemented, at the end of the year, by the Type E, a sports version of the Type D. The pre-war Type C also reappeared, without real improvements, apart from a revised and improved bodywork. 

It was not until the end of 1924 that a much more serious project saw the light of day, in the form of the Type Z. A car co-designed by the English engineer Harry Ricardo, known in the automotive world for his studies on combustion systems and the many associated patents he held. The Le Zèbre-Riccardo partnership was warmly welcomed by the trade press, which hoped that the Suresnes company will be able to get out of its period of stagnation. From 1925 to 1930, it was the only car marketed by Le Zèbre. In the end only 550 Type Z’s were built, and faced with this new failure and the economic slump, the company closed permanently in 1931.

Altogether, Le Zèbre produced 9,500 cars between 1909 and 1931, of which about 250 examples remain today.

Bibliography
Epopee de la societe Le Zebre by Philip Schram.

Gallery

References

External links

Only official book about Le Zebre Make. Its content can be read online
A well-preserved example in Norway - Pictures (Norwegian)

Cars of France
French brands
Defunct motor vehicle manufacturers of France
Suresnes